Optymistychna (: meaning "optimistic", also known as Peschtschera Optimistitscheskaya) is a gypsum cave located near the Ukrainian village of Korolivka, Chortkiv  Raion, Ternopil Oblast. Approximately  of passageways have been mapped within. As a result, it is the longest cave in Eurasia and the sixth-longest cave in the world, after Mammoth Cave, Sistema Sac Actun, Jewel Cave, Shuanghedong and Sistema Ox Bel Ha. It is also the longest gypsum cave in the world.

History 
The cave complex was discovered by the speleologists of the Lviv speleological club "Cyclope" in 1966. It was entirely unknown before then. There have been more than 50 expeditions since then, but exploration has slowed significantly in recent years, and very little surveying is currently being done.

In 2008, the cave was recognized as a Natural Wonder of Ukraine.

Geology 

They are often choked with mud. They comprise a dense network on several levels, making Optymistychna known as a "maze cave".

Optymistychna's gypsum bed is topped with a limestone layer, which has seeped through into the cave via erosion and formed into calcite speleothems. At other places, the gypsum has formed crystals, often tinted a multitude of colors by mineral salts. In some areas, large gypsum rosettes have formed, colored black by manganese oxide.

Notes

See also
List of longest caves

References

External links

 Official site of Optimistic cave
 Chapter II.9, Gypsum Karst in the Western Ukraine by Alexander Klimchouk article appearing in: International Journal of Speleology, vol. 25, #3-4, 1996, p. 263-278.

Geography of Ternopil Oblast
Gypsum caves
Caves of Ukraine
Natural heritage sites in Ternopil Oblast